Craig Detweiler (born 1964) is a writer, filmmaker, and cultural commentator. He is dean of the College of Fine Arts and Production at Grand Canyon University in Phoenix, Arizona.

Early life and career
Detweiler grew up in Charlotte, North Carolina. He is a Phi Beta Kappa graduate from Davidson College with a B.A. in English. He went on to receive a Master of Fine Arts from the University of Southern California's School of Cinema/TV. Later he received a Masters of Divinity and PhD in theology and culture at Fuller Theological Seminary. While at Fuller, he co-founded the Windrider Forum, a "vehicle to promote the presentation and exploration of the human story through film and visual media". He served as associate professor and chair of the Mass Communication Department at Biola University in La Mirada, California. Detweiler also served as professor of communication at Pepperdine University in Malibu, California. In 2016, Variety recognized Detweiler as the Mentor of the Year.

Screenplays
As a screenwriter, he has written over ten feature-length screenplays, including The Duke (1999) for Buena Vista and the road trip comedy Extreme Days (2001). In 1996, he directed a documentary, Williams Syndrome: A Highly Musical Species, which premiered at the Boston Film Festival.

Books
Detweiler's first book, co-written with Barry Taylor, was A Matrix of Meanings: Finding God in Pop Culture, dealing with relationships between advertising, movies, music, TV and the divine. Other Detweiler books include: Into the Dark: Seeing the Sacred in the Top Films of the 21st Century (2008), discussing contemporary film from a social, cultural, and theological perspective; A Purple State of Mind: Finding Middle Ground in a Divided Culture, a companion piece to his documentary film Purple State of Mind;  iGods:  How Technology Shapes our Spiritual and Social Lives (2013), a theology of technology, internet and social media.  Selfies: Searching for the Image of God in a Digital Age (2018) received an Award of Merit for the best books in Culture and the Arts from Christianity Today. He has also edited two collections of essays, Halos and Avatars: Playing Video Games with God and Don't Stop Believin': Pop Culture and Religion from Ben-Hur to Zombies.

Films
In 2008, Detweiler produced and directed a documentary, Purple State of Mind which explores the blue state/red state tension in the United States.   In 2013, Detweiler produced and directed a documentary, unCommon Sounds which brought musicians to Lebanon and Indonesia to build sustainable peace through music.  It premiered on ABC's "Visions and Values" series.

Selected works
Deep Focus: Film and Theology in Dialogue, with Robert K. Johnston and Kutter Callaway, Baker Academic, 2019
Selfies: Searching for the Image of God in a Digital Age, Brazos Press, 2018
iGods: How Technology Shapes Our Spiritual and Social Lives, Brazos Press, 2013
Don't Stop Believin': Pop Culture and Religion from Ben-Hur to Zombies—Co-editor, Westminster John Knox, 2012
Halos and Avatars: Playing Video Games with God—Editor, Westminster John Knox, 2010
Into the Dark: Seeing the Sacred in the Top Films of the 21st Century—Baker Academic, 2008
A Purple State of Mind: Finding Middle Ground in a Divided Culture—Conversant Life, 2008
A Matrix of Meanings: Finding God in Pop Culture, co-written with Barry Taylor—Baker Academic, 2003
"The Wire: Playing the Game" in Small Screen, Big Picture: Television and Lived Religion -- Diane Winston, editor, Baylor University Press, 2009
"Christianity and Film" in Routledge Companion to Religion and Film—John Lyden, editor, 2009

Affiliations and awards

American Academy of Religion, "Religion, Film and Visual Group," steering committee, 2007–2012
Audience Award, "Purple State of Mind," Tallahassee Film Festival, 2009
Best Spiritual Film, "Purple State of Mind," Breckenridge Festival of Film, 2008
Finalist, Book of the Year, Into the Dark, Collide Magazine, 2008
Finalist, Gold Medallion in Theology, A Matrix of Meanings, 2004
Cine Golden Eagle, "Williams Syndrome", 1996
Silver Award, Feature Documentary, "Williams Syndrome," WorldFest Charleston, 1996
Crystal Heart Award, "Williams Syndrome," Heartland Film Festival, 1996

References

Biola University faculty profile

External links
Craig Detweiler at WorldCat Identities
Interview with Jana Riess, 8 February 2010

Purple State of Mind blog

1964 births
Living people
Writers from Charlotte, North Carolina
American male screenwriters
Davidson College alumni
USC School of Cinematic Arts alumni
Fuller Theological Seminary alumni
Pepperdine University faculty
Biola University faculty
Screenwriters from California
Screenwriters from North Carolina